The 2020 SWAC women's basketball tournament was a postseason women's basketball tournament scheduled to take place March 10–14, 2020. Tournament first-round games were held on campus sites at the higher seed on March 10. The remaining rounds and the semifinals and championship were to be held at the Bartow Arena in Birmingham, Alabama. The winner would have received the Southwestern Athletic Conference's automatic bid to the 2020 NCAA Division I women's basketball tournament.

Unlike most NCAA Division I basketball conference tournaments, the SWAC tournament does not include all of the league's teams. The tournament instead features only the top eight teams from regular-season SWAC play. On March 12, the NCAA announced that the tournament was cancelled due to the coronavirus pandemic.

Seeds

Bracket

First round games at campus sites of lower-numbered seeds

See also
 2020 SWAC men's basketball tournament

External links
 2020 Toyota SWAC Tournament Brackets

References

SWAC women's basketball tournament
2019–20 Southwestern Athletic Conference women's basketball season
Basketball competitions in Birmingham, Alabama
2020 in sports in Alabama
College sports tournaments in Alabama
SWAC women's basketball tournament